Gábor Dayka (March 21, 1769 in Miskolc – October 20, 1796 in Ungvár) was a Hungarian poet.

Ödön Szamovolszky sculpted the statue of Gábor Dayka. From 1909 until October 1944, it stood in front of the Hungarian-language Drugeth High School in Uzhhorod. It was re-erected on 16 April 1994 after decades of adventures.

References 

Hungarian male poets
1769 births
1796 deaths
18th-century Hungarian poets
18th-century Hungarian male writers